Arpad Simonyik (born February 23, 1940 in Bečej) is a Canadian sprint canoer who competed in the mid to late 1960s. He was eliminated in the semifinals of the K-1 1000 m event at the 1964 Summer Olympics in Tokyo. Four years later in Mexico City, Simonyik was eliminated in the heats of the K-2 1000 m event and the semifinals of the K-4 1000 m event.

References
Sports-reference.com profile

1940 births
Canadian male canoeists
Canoeists at the 1964 Summer Olympics
Canoeists at the 1968 Summer Olympics
Living people
Olympic canoeists of Canada
People from Bečej